Kavi or KAVI may refer to:

People
 Agasthya Kavi, 14th century composer from Warangal
 Appachcha Kavi (1868–1930), Indian poet and playwright
 Archana Kavi (born 1988), Indian film actress and YouTuber
 Arunachala Kavi (1711–1779), Tamil poet and a composer
 Ashok Row Kavi (born 1947), Indian journalist and LGBT rights activist
 Emmanuel Kavi (born 1970), African contemporary artist and painter
 Giriraja Kavi, 18th century Telugu composer
 Gnanananda Kavi (born 1922), Indian poet
 Lakshmidhara Kavi, Advaita Vedanta preceptor and writer of Advaita Makaranda
 Kasula Purushottama Kavi (fl. 1798), Indian poet
 Nadella Purushottama Kavi (1863–1939), scholar, playwright, teacher and editor
 Nanalal Dalpatram Kavi (1877–1946), Gujarati author and poet
 Oothukkadu Venkata Kavi (1700s–1765), Indian composer
 Udumalai Narayana Kavi (1899–1981), Tamil poet
 Kavi Bhushan (c. 1613–1712), Indian court poet
 Kavi Kalash (died 1689), Indian Brahmin and poet
 Kavi Kant (1867–1923), Gujarati poet, playwright and essayist
 Kavi Kumar Azad (?–2018), Indian actor
 Kavi Kunjara Bharati (1810–1896), Tamil poet and a composer
 Kavi Pradeep (1915–1998), Indian poet and songwriter
 Kavi Raz (born 1953), Indian-born British actor, writer, director and producer
 Kavi Shastri (born 1986), British film and television actor

Other uses
 Kavi, Gujarat, a place in India
 Kavi (film), a Hindi film of 1954
 KAVI-LP, a radio station in Colorado 
 Kavi, Best Live Action Short Film nominee at 82nd Academy Awards in 2010

See also
 
 Kawi (disambiguation)
 Kaviraj, a title of honor given to poets and litterateurs attached to royal courts in medieval India
 Kalleh Kavi, a village in Iran
 Rishi, an inspired poet of hymns from the Vedas
 Kayanian dynasty, a dynasty of Persian tradition and folklore which supposedly ruled after the Pishdadids